Al-Ahrar Sport Club, is an Iraqi football team based in Wasit, that plays in Iraq Division Two.

Managerial history
 Riyadh Sada
 Ali Radhi
 Taha Arad Jabbar
 Saad Rabeh
 Murtadha Al-Hajji

See also 
 2021–22 Iraq FA Cup

References

External links
 Al-Ahrar SC on Goalzz.com
 Iraq Clubs- Foundation Dates

2003 establishments in Iraq
Association football clubs established in 2003
Football clubs in Wasit